Carex nigricans is a species of sedge known by the common name black alpine sedge.

Distribution
This sedge is native to western North America from Alaska to the Sierra Nevada in California, to Colorado, where it grows in wet areas in mountain, taiga, and tundra habitat.

Description
Carex nigricans produces thick mats and loose clumps of stems up to 30 centimeters tall from a network of short rhizomes. The pistillate flowers have dark bracts and the fruit is covered in a dark colored, long beaked perigynium.

External links
Jepson Manual Treatment - Carex nigricans
USDA Plants Profile
Flora of North America
Carex nigricans - Photo gallery

nigricans
Alpine flora
Flora of Western Canada
Flora of the Western United States
Flora of the Sierra Nevada (United States)
Flora of California
Flora of Oregon
Flora of Alaska
Flora of British Columbia
Flora of the West Coast of the United States
Plants described in 1831
Flora without expected TNC conservation status